Roman Steblecki (born 16 March 1963) is a Polish former ice hockey player. He played for Cracovia, Hockey Club de Reims, Nittorps IK, and Kristianstads IK during his career. Steblecki also played for the Polish national team at the 1988 Winter Olympics. His son Sebastian is a footballer.

References

External links
 

1963 births
Living people
Hockey Club de Reims players
Ice hockey players at the 1988 Winter Olympics
Kristianstads IK players
MKS Cracovia (ice hockey) players
Olympic ice hockey players of Poland
People from Skarżysko County
Sportspeople from Świętokrzyskie Voivodeship
Polish ice hockey forwards
Polish expatriate sportspeople in France
Polish expatriate sportspeople in Sweden